Gaye Advert (born 25 August 1956), also Gaye Black, is an English punk rock musician, who played bass guitar in the band The Adverts in the late 1970s. She was one of the first female rock stars of the punk rock movement, whom The Virgin Encyclopedia of 70s Music called the "first female punk star". She was "one of punk’s first female icons". Dave Thompson wrote that her "photogenic" looks, "panda-eye make-up and omnipresent leather jacket defined the face of female punkdom until well into the next decade".

Biography

Black - along with fellow Adverts founding member T. V. Smith - was from Bideford, a small coastal town in Devon. She started playing bass in her room to pass the time, chosen as it was her favourite instrument.

After she finished college, qualifying in graphic design, the pair moved to London due to a lack of jobs and other opportunities in Devon. They formed the band there in 1976. They were later married.

After the demise of the Adverts in 1979, Advert stopped playing bass and disappeared from the British punk scene. She has said that she was "a bit disillusioned and worn out," and felt picked on by the press. She then took up a career as a manager in social services. She recounted her experiences of being in the band in an interview for Zillah Minx's 2010 film She's a Punk Rocker UK.

She continues to create art, often in the medium of stained glass, and began to exhibit her work in 2008.

References

Living people
English punk rock bass guitarists
People from Bideford
Musicians from Devon
Women bass guitarists
1956 births
The Adverts members
Women in punk